Sabinian or Savinian may refer to:

People
 Marcus Iunius Rufinus Sabinianus, Roman consul in 155
 Gaius Vettius Sabinianus Julius Hospes, Roman consul circa 176
 Gaius Vettius Gratus Sabinianus, Roman consul in 221
 Gaius Vettius Gratus Atticus Sabinianus, Roman consul in 242
 Sabinian of Troyes, a Christian martyr and saint
 Savinian and Potentian, Christian martyrs and saints
 Sabinian (proconsul), the leader of a revolt against Roman Emperor Gordian III in province of Africa
 Sabinianus Magnus, Roman general
 Sabinian (consul 505), consul in 505
 Anastasius (consul 517), consul in 517, whose full name was Anastasius Paulus Probus Sabinianus Pompeius
 Pope Sabinian

Other
 Sabinian school, a school of law in ancient Rome named after Masurius Sabinus

See also
 Sabinianus (disambiguation)